In the 2016–17 season, Partizani Tirana competed in the Kategoria Superiore for the fourth consecutive season. The club also participated in the UEFA Champions League after Skënderbeu Korçë's exclusion from the European competitions during the season due to the match-fixing. That was the first participation in the Champions League after 23 seasons as well. In the league, Partizani finished in second place again after losing a title race with Kukësi.

First-team squad
Squad at end of season

Left club during season

Competitions

Kategoria Superiore

League table

Results summary

Results by matchday

Matches

Albanian Cup

First round

Second round

UEFA Champions League

Second qualifying round

Third qualifying round

UEFA Europa League

Play-off round

Notes

References

External links

Partizani
FK Partizani Tirana seasons
Partizani
Partizani